Dobreanu River may refer to:

 Dobreanu River (Bistricioara)
 Dobreanu River (Neamț)

See also 
 Dobrenaș River
 Dobre (disambiguation)